The Gate Crasher is a 1928 American comedy film directed by William James Craft and written by Carl Krusada, Vin Moore, William James Craft and Albert DeMond. The film stars Glenn Tryon, Patsy Ruth Miller, T. Roy Barnes, Carla Laemmle (credited as Beth Laemmle), Fred Malatesta and Claude Payton. The film was released on December 9, 1928, by Universal Pictures.

Cast        
Glenn Tryon as Dick Henshaw
Patsy Ruth Miller as Mara Di Leon
T. Roy Barnes as Hal Reade
Carla Laemmle as Maid 
Fred Malatesta as Julio
Claude Payton as Zanfield 
Russ Powell as Caesar
Tiny Sandford as Stage Doorman
Albert J. Smith as Pedro 
Monte Montague as Crook

References

External links
 

1928 films
1920s English-language films
Silent American comedy films
1928 comedy films
Universal Pictures films
Films directed by William James Craft
American silent feature films
American black-and-white films
1920s American films